Katar is a large village in Piro block of Bhojpur district, Bihar, India. It is located south of Piro, near NH 30. As of 2011, its population was 13,484, in 1,970 households.

References 

Villages in Bhojpur district, India